Rolland Courbis (born 12 August 1953) is a French football manager and former professional player who played as adefender. He was most recently manager of Stade Rennais F.C., having replaced Philippe Montanier on 20 January 2016.

Career 
Born in Marseille, Courbis played for Olympique de Marseille, Ajaccio, Olympiacos, Sochaux, Monaco and Toulon.

He coached Toulon, US Marseille Endoume, Bordeaux, Toulouse, Olympique de Marseille, Lens, AC Ajaccio, Al-Wahda FC (Abu Dhabi), Russian FC Alania Vladikavkaz, Montpellier HSC, Niger and FC Sion.

He is a sport radio talk host with RMC, his daily show is called "Coach Courbis".

Honours

As a player 
Monaco
French championship: 1978, 1982
Coupe de France: 1980

Toulon
French Division 2: 1983OlympiacosSuper League Greece: 1974

 As a coach AC AjaccioLigue 2: 2002BordeauxCoupe de la Ligue runners-up: 1997MarseilleUEFA Cup runners-up: 1999USM Alger'''
Algerian Cup: 2013
UAFA Club Cup: 2013

References

External links 
 
 Rolland Courbis Interview
 Rolland Courbis: "Too many incomprehensible things" in Niger

1953 births
Living people
Footballers from Marseille
French footballers
Association football defenders
Olympique de Marseille players
AC Ajaccio players
Olympiacos F.C. players
FC Sochaux-Montbéliard players
AS Monaco FC players
SC Toulon players
Ligue 1 players
French football managers
SC Toulon managers
FC Girondins de Bordeaux managers
Toulouse FC managers
Olympique de Marseille managers
RC Lens managers
AC Ajaccio managers
USM Alger managers
Montpellier HSC managers
FC Spartak Vladikavkaz managers
Russian Premier League managers
Expatriate football managers in Russia
Ligue 1 managers
Expatriate football managers in Niger
Niger national football team managers
Expatriate football managers in Switzerland
Stade Rennais F.C. managers
French expatriate football managers
French expatriate sportspeople in Russia
French expatriate sportspeople in Niger
French expatriate sportspeople in Switzerland
FC Sion managers